The 2019 Norisring Nürnberg 200 Speedweekend (official name: ADAC Norisring Nürnberg 200 Speedweekend 2019) was a motor racing event for the Deutsche Tourenwagen Masters (DTM) held between 6 and 7 July 2019. The event, part of the 33rd season of the DTM and also 53rd annual running of Norisring Nürnberg 200 Speedweekend was held at the Norisring in Germany.

Background
Jamie Green returned to the Audi Sport Team Rosberg seat having successfully undergone surgery to remove his appendix. His Misano replacement, Pietro Fittipaldi, subsequently returned to his regular seat at Audi Sport Team WRT.

Results

Race 1

Qualifying

 – Car #25 was given a three-place grid penalty for blocking another car.

Race

Race 2

Qualifying

 – Cars #53, #76 and #99 were each given a five-place grid penalty for not respecting red flag procedure.

Race

Championship standings

Drivers Championship

Teams Championship

Manufacturers Championship

 Note: Only the top five positions are included for three sets of standings.

See also
 2019 W Series Nuremberg round

References

External links
Official website

|- style="text-align:center"
|width="35%"|Previous race:
|width="30%"|Deutsche Tourenwagen Masters2019 season
|width="40%"|Next race:

Nuremberg DTM
DTM Nuremberg